This article contains the results of the Republic of Ireland national football team during the 1990s.

1990

1991

1992

1993

1994

1995

1996

1997

1998

1999

See also
 Republic of Ireland national football team - 1980s Results
 Republic of Ireland national football team - Results 2000-09

Notes

References

1990s
1989–90 in Republic of Ireland association football
1990–91 in Republic of Ireland association football
1991–92 in Republic of Ireland association football
1992–93 in Republic of Ireland association football
1993–94 in Republic of Ireland association football
1994–95 in Republic of Ireland association football
1995–96 in Republic of Ireland association football
1996–97 in Republic of Ireland association football
1997–98 in Republic of Ireland association football
1998–99 in Republic of Ireland association football
1999–2000 in Republic of Ireland association football